Four in a Bed (also known as Three in a Bed from 2010–11 and 2015–16) is a British reality television game show that has been airing on Channel 4 since 21 April 2010. The show involves B&B owners, who take turns to stay with one another and pay what they consider fair for their stay after giving feedback. The winner is the establishment named the best value for money.   Each group consists of four B&Bs visiting each other and thus a winner is declared every five episodes.

Format
Each pair of B&B owners (or single owner, in some cases) visits each other's B&B. At the start of their visit, they are told how much their room costs and if there are any separate charges for breakfast. The owners then inspect the room, picking up on anything untidy or out of place. Afterwards, they take turns in some sort of entertainment activity where there is usually a mini-competition.  The host then takes the guests to dinner where the guests usually get to know the backstory of how the host entered into their business in the first place.  Everyone then goes to bed. Upon waking up in the morning, they then have breakfast, usually all together. Finally, they each fill in an anonymous feedback form rating and commenting on five aspects of the B&B - Hosting (eg friendliness, professionalism); Cleanliness; Facilities (eg room layout, furnishings, decoration, shared/private bathroom, room extras like snacks); Sleep quality (eg bed size and comfort, noise, temperature); and Breakfast (quality, choice, service etc), before saying if they'd stay there again. The B&B owners get to see their feedback once the guests have gone and it can leave them feeling slightly revengeful if they feel aggrieved by the comments. The guests also pay an amount of money based on their perceived value of the B&B – if a guest believes it wasn't worth the money, they underpay. If they think it was worth the money, they pay exactly. And on rare occasions, guests have paid more than the stated cost of the B&B, particularly if they felt the establishment was very good. The payment amounts are all kept secret until the last episode of the week.

After all four B&Bs have been visited, the hosts get together to confront each other about the comments and the payments they have received. The winner is revealed at the end, being the B&B that has received the highest percentage of what they charged. So a B&B charging £80 and receiving payment in full from each of the others, would win over one charging £130 that received £125 from each of the others.

On occasion, one of the teams may drop out midway through the competition (e.g. due to illness). In such cases where they are unable to finish the competition, they will not receive their payments from other hosts (if they hosted before leaving) and vice versa (if they visited other hosts before leaving). For hosts with two members, the absence of one will allow the other to continue in the competition as normal.

Three In a Bed differences
The format for Three in A Bed slightly differs from Four in a Bed in certain aspects.  First, all three B&Bs are visited in one episode.  Consequently, each episode lasts for one hour, including advertisements.  The order of the entertainment and dinner (occasionally lunch) meal were interchangeable.  Third, for series 1 and 2, the feedback was orally given to hosts immediately at the end of each stay.  In series 3, the feedback was written in a guestbook and was more free-flowing compared to Four In A Bed'''s anonymous feedback forms where the rivals had to focus on several areas.  Additionally, for series 1, the payments were also revealed at the end of each stay.

Transmissions

Three in a Bed

Four in a Bed

International versions
A French version of the series, called Bienvenue chez nous, began airing on France's TF1 on 30 January 2012.

A Dutch version, called Bed & Breakfast, began airing on NPO 1 on 4 June 2015.

Controversies
In February 2013, some business owners who participated in Four in a Bed'' sought legal help after receiving abuse from the public. In the most extreme case, police were called in to investigate abuse that included the sending of excrement through the post and threats of physical violence. Other businesses and owners claim to have suffered abuse via the placing of alleged fake reviews on TripAdvisor, e-mails, phone calls and letters.

References

External links
 
 

2010s British reality television series
2020s British reality television series
2010 British television series debuts
Hospitality industry in the United Kingdom
Television series by All3Media